The White Suit is a 1999 Serbian language film directed by Lazar Ristovski. It was a co-production between the United Kingdom and Federal Republic of Yugoslavia. It was Yugoslavia's official Best Foreign Language Film submission at the 72nd Academy Awards, but did not manage to receive a nomination.

Cast
Lazar Ristovski - Savo / Vuko Tiodorovic
Radmila Shchogolyeva - Karmen
Dragan Nikolić - Makro
Bata Živojinović - Gospodin
Danilo Stojković - Svestenik
Bogdan Diklić - Masinovodja 
Radoš Bajić - Vlasnik

References

External links

1990s Serbian-language films
1999 films
Serbian comedy-drama films
1999 comedy-drama films
Films set in Serbia
Films shot in Serbia